Hierro is a Spanish-French mystery drama television series, created by Pepe Coira. It was produced by Movistar+, ARTE France, Portocabo and Atlantique Productions. The first season was released on Movistar+ on 7 June 2019. In September 2019, the series was renewed for a second season, and on 21 January 2021 a trailer was released. Bringing a closure to the series, the second season aired from 19 February to 19 March 2021.

Premise
Investigating magistrate Candela is transferred to El Hierro, the most remote of the Canary Islands. There, she discovers a suspicious community and is confronted by the death of a young local boy, murdered the night before his wedding. The prime suspect is the father of the bride, a man by the name of Díaz, a businessman with a dodgy reputation. Despite being motivated by diametrically opposite interests, Candela and Díaz share the same goal: to find the real killer.

Cast
Candela Peña as Candela Montes
Darío Grandinetti as Antonio Díaz
Tania Santana as Idaira
Kimberley Tell as Pilar
Saulo Trujillo as Daniel
Yaiza Guimaré as Elvira
Luifer Rodríguez as Bernardo
Ángel Casanova as Nicolás
Marga Arnau as Ángela
Maykol Hernández as Braulio

Season 1
Juan Carlos Vellido as Sargento Alejandro Morata
Mónica López as Reyes
Isaac B. Dos Santos as Yeray
Cristóbal Pinto as Tomás
Mari Carmen Sánchez as Asunción
Antonia San Juan as Samir

Season 2
Matias Varela as Gaspar Cabrera
Aroha Hafez as Lucía Dueñas
Ciro Miró as Alfredo Dueñas
Naira Lleó as Ágata Varela Dueñas
Helena Sempere as Dácil Varela Dueñas
 as Fadi Najjar
Iris Díaz as Cruz
Aina Clotet as Tamara Arias
Celia Castro as Clara Corcuera
 as Sicario

Episodes

Season 1 (2019)

Season 2 (2021)

Awards and nominations 

|-
| align = "center" rowspan = "10" | 2019 || rowspan = "2" | 66th Ondas Awards || colspan = "2" | Best Spanish Series ||  || rowspan = "2" | 
|-
| Best Actress || Candela Peña || 
|-
| rowspan = "4" | 21st Iris Awards || colspan = "2" | Best Fiction ||  || rowspan = "4" | 
|-
| Best Screenplay || Pepe Coira ||  
|-
| Best Actress || Candela Peña || 
|-
| Best Actor || Darío Grandinetti || 
|-
| rowspan = "4" | 7th  || colspan = "2" | Best Drama Series ||  || rowspan = "4" | 
|-
| Best Direction || Pepe Coira || 
|-
| Best Screenplay || Pepe Coira, Fran Araújo, Araceli Gonda, Coral Cruz and Carlos Portela ||  
|-
| Best Drama Actress || Candela Peña || 
|-
| align = "center" rowspan = "5" | 2020 || rowspan = "3" | 7th Feroz Awards || colspan  = "2" | Best Drama Series ||  || rowspan = "3" | 
|-
| Best Leading Actress (TV) || Candela Peña || 
|-
| Best Leading Actor (TV) || Darío Grandinetti || 
|-
| 29th Actors and Actresses Union Awards || Best Leading Actress (TV) || Candela Peña ||  || 
|-
| 25th  || colspan = "2" | Best Series ||  || 
|-
| align = "center" rowspan = "3" | 2021 || rowspan = "3" | 27th Forqué Awards || colspan = "2" | Best Fiction Series ||  || rowspan = "3" | 
|-
| Best Actress (TV series) || Candela Peña || 
|-
| Best Actor (TV series) || Darío Grandinetti || 
|}

References

External links
 
 

2019 Spanish television series debuts
2021 Spanish television series endings
Spanish thriller television series
Spanish-language television shows
Spanish mystery television series
Television shows set in the Canary Islands
Movistar+ network series
2010s Spanish drama television series
2020s Spanish drama television series
Fiction about serial killers